Howard Spencer Richmond (18 January 1918 — 20 May 2012) was an American music publisher and music industry executive. He established The Richmond Organization, Inc. (TRO), one of the largest independent music publishing organizations in the world, and had a hand in commercializing and promoting many pop, folk and rock songs since the 1940s.

Life and career
Richmond was born in Queens, New York. He attended the Loomis Chaffee School from 1931 to 1935, graduating in 1935, and thereafter, the University of Pennsylvania. He began working in the music business in 1935, soon establishing his own press office in New York City to publicize clients who included Glenn Miller, Frank Sinatra, Dinah Shore, the Andrews Sisters, and Woody Herman. During World War II he served in the Army Air Corps, before helping Buddy Robbins to establish the Robbins Artist Bureau, later known as the American Artists Bureau.

In late June 1949, Richmond teamed up with H. Z. Roland, lyricist Carl Sigman, disk jockey Gene Rayburn and British musician Billy Whitlock to form a music publishing company. The purpose of the new venture was to publish Sigman and Rayburn's new lyrics to the song "Scotch Hot, Hopscotch Polka", which had been composed and recorded in England by Whitlock for British Decca Records. Richmond was not originally one of the partners in the company, but instead was to handle the publicity. Named Cromwell Music, Inc., the company setup in an office at 119 West 57th Street in New York and affiliated itself with the performance rights organization American Society of Composers, Authors and Publishers. "Hop-Scotch Polka" was officially published on July 6, 1949 and was quickly recorded by Guy Lombardo for Decca Records, Art Mooney for M-G-M Records, The Three Suns for RCA-Victor and Bill Gale for Columbia Records; it was a hit.

In September 1949, Bob Baumgart was hired as Cromwell Music's East Coast contact man. In October 1949, Bob Stern was hired as West Coast contact man and Saxie Dowell for the Midwest, based in Chicago. In November, Lucky Wilber replaced Bob Stern for West Coast representation. Cromwell Music followed up with the No. 1 hit "Music! Music! Music!", written by Stephan Weiss and Bernie Baum, and recorded by Teresa Brewer.

In early February 1950, Richmond bought out Cromwell Music's interests from H. Z. Roland and Carl Sigman and became sole owner of the firm. Richmond rapidly expanded and formed several other publishing imprints, affiliated with both ASCAP and BMI. In June 1950, he formed his second music publishing company, Spencer Music, Inc., which was named after his middle name and affiliated with Broadcast Music, Inc. Richmond was General Professional Manager, Peter Kameron was named Professional Manager and Lucky Wilber West Coast Representative of Spencer Music. Richmond's offices then moved to a bigger location at 129 West 52nd Street in New York.

In September 1950, Richmond formed his third music publishing company, Warwick Music, Inc., affiliated with ASCAP. Only a month later, however, Warwick Music, Inc. was renamed Essex Music, Inc. due to the existence of another already existing, unrelated Warwick Music, Inc. music publishing firm. In October 1950, he formed his fourth music publishing company, Hollis Music, Inc., which was affiliated with BMI. Loring Buzzell, former employee of Irving Mills' Mills Music, Inc., was named Professional Manager in charge of Hollis Music, under Richmond who was General Professional Manager. In December 1950, Richmond co-acquired the music publishing company, Folkways Music Publishers, Inc., with Pete Seeger and other members of The Weavers (credited as Paul Campbell). Folkways Music Publishers was tied to BMI and assigned to Professional Manager Peter Kameron (who also managed The Weavers) and West Coast Representative Lucky Wilber.

Also in December 1950, Richmond welcomed Al Brackman as General Professional Manager of Hollis Music and General Manager of all BMI affiliates, the later officially stepped into the position on January 2, 1951. In January 1951, Richmond renamed Spencer Music, Inc. to Ludlow Music, Inc. In March 1951, Richmond formed another imprint, Dartmouth Music, Inc. mainly for the purpose of accommodating foreign compositions in the United States. Dartmouth was eventually linked to ASCAP in July 1951 and Richmond placed Loring Buzzell as General Professional Manager of the company. Also in 1951, the Richmond firms moved to an even bigger office, located at 666 Fifth Avenue, New York. In March 1951, Richmond began working on establishing music publishing firms in the United Kingdom and Europe. In September 1951, he went abroad intending to form Cromwell Music, Ltd., based in London, England, and Éditions Cromwell, based in France, but the companies stalled.

In 1952, Richmond formed his own record label, Mars Records, which was co-operated with musician Woody Herman. In April 1952, Richmond formed a country music publishing imprint named Melody Trails, Inc., tied with BMI. Melody Trails officially launched in September 1952 and was based in Nashville, Tennessee and managed by Vic McAlpin. In 1953, the companies moved to yet another bigger headquarters, located at 151 West 46th Street, New York, where they would remain for several years. In August 1955, Richmond finally formed a British imprint, Essex Music, Ltd. based in London, England to administer the publishing of songs in the British Empire and to facilitate the licensing of American songs overseas. He named David Platz as Professional Manager of Essex Music, Ltd., who started the job on September 1, 1955. Cromwell Music, Ltd., which had originally been planned to launch in England in 1951, was finally launched in June 1956. Platz was named General Manager of Cromwell Music, Ltd. Loring Buzzell left the Richmond organization in October 1955 and went on to form his own music publishing company Hecht-Lancaster & Buzzell Music.

In the late 1950s, Richmond restructured the firm under the umbrella company name of The Richmond Organization (commonly abbreviated as TRO), successfully attracting writers providing songs and record producers looking to find them. One key to Richmond's expansion was his emphasis on promoting records through radio stations and their disc jockeys, rather than on promoting songs through live performances. In the early 1950s, Richmond had particular success through promoting the songs and work of folk performers, notably Lead Belly (Huddie Ledbetter), Woody Guthrie and The Weavers, who included Pete Seeger. Richmond promoted the Weavers' version of Lead Belly's song "Goodnight Irene" by sending copies of the record to disc jockeys across the US – a technique that had not been widely used before – and the result was sales of over 250,000 sheet music copies and 500,000 records. Richmond also worked closely with Woody Guthrie, providing him with a tape recorder to record his songs, many of which subsequently became commercially successful. Another song that was successfully published and promoted by Richmond was "Kisses Sweeter Than Wine", first performed and recorded by The Weavers and later a hit for Jimmy Rodgers. The song was copyrighted in the names of Joel Newman and Paul Campbell, both pseudonyms used by Richmond, though Pete Seeger later claimed that its tune was derived from a traditional Irish melody, modified by Lead Belly, with new lyrics by Seeger and Lee Hays. Similar concerns over authorship have also been expressed in relation to "The Lion Sleeps Tonight", otherwise known as "Wimoweh", on which "Paul Campbell" is credited as co-writer.

Throughout the 1950s and 1960s, many of the pop songs published by Richmond found success. These included "I Believe", "Fly Me to the Moon", "As Long As He Needs Me", "What Kind of Fool Am I?", and "Those Were the Days", as well as songs initiated by Ledbetter, Guthrie, Seeger and others such as "If I Had a Hammer", "Rock Island Line", "We Shall Overcome" and "Turn! Turn! Turn!". He increasingly developed the company's interests outside of the United States, working with English and French songwriters such as Lionel Bart, Anthony Newley, Leslie Bricusse and Charles Aznavour. In the 1960s and 1970s, he developed links with writers such as Shel Silverstein and, through the subsidiary company Essex Music, British rock musicians including Pink Floyd, The Who, David Bowie, The Moody Blues and Black Sabbath.

In 1969, together with Johnny Mercer and Abe Olman, Richmond co-founded the National Academy of Popular Music (NAPM) and the Songwriters’ Hall of Fame to honor songwriters for their contributions to popular music. In 1983, he received the Songwriters Hall of Fame's first ever Abe Olman Publisher of the Year Award. Richmond continued as Chairman of the Board of The Richmond Organization and The Essex Music Group, although from the 1990s active control was in the hands of his sons, Larry and Frank Richmond.

Richmond died at his home in Rancho Mirage, California, on May 20, 2012.

Parent, subsidiaries, imprints (former and current) 
Active New York entities (as of January 2015)

 Cromwell Music, Inc.
 Cheshire Music, Inc.
 Connaught Music, Inc.
 Devon Music, Inc.
 Essex Music, Inc.
 Essex Music International, Inc.
 Folkways Music Publishers, Inc.
 Hampshire House Publishing Corp.
 Hollis Music, Inc.
 Ludlow Music, Inc.
 Melody Trails, Inc.
 Samuel Bronston Music Publishing, Inc.
 Songways Service, Inc.
 Spencer Music Corporation
 The Richmond Organization, Inc. (parent)
 Total Music, Inc.
 Total Music Services, Inc.
 T. R. O., Inc.
 MusCadet Productions, Inc.
 Musical Comedy Productions, Inc.
 Workshop Productions, Inc.
 Worldwide Music Services, Inc.

Active New York not-for-profit corporation
 Anita B. and Howard S. Richmond Foundation, Inc. 501(c)3

Inactive California entity
 TRO-Palm Valley Music, Inc. (dissolved)

Status not known
 Dartmouth Music, Inc.
 Manchester
 Riverside Drive Music, Inc.
 Words and Music, Inc.

Notes

References

1918 births
2012 deaths
American music publishers (people)
American music industry executives
Loomis Chaffee School alumni